Maulvi Shahabuddin Delawar (born; 1950s) is an Afghan senior leader of the Taliban and Islamic scholar. Delawar is the current Minister of Minerals and Petroleum of the Islamic Emirate of Afghanistan since 23 November 2021. He was a founding member of their negotiating team based in Qatar, arrived there in January 2012. He served as ambassador to Pakistan and Saudi Arabia under the Taliban government. He also served as Consul General at the Afghan Consulate in Peshawar.

Delawar belongs to Logar province. He completed his graduation from Darul Uloom Haqqania. He has been associated with the teaching profession. As of 2021, he is running a religious seminary in Peshawar. Delawar joined the Taliban in the 1990s when they emerged in Afghanistan.

References

1950s births
Living people
Year of birth uncertain
People from Logar Province
Taliban leaders
Darul Uloom Haqqania alumni
Ambassadors of Afghanistan to Pakistan
Ambassadors of Afghanistan to Saudi Arabia
Afghan diplomats
Taliban government ministers of Afghanistan